Mikkelsen Bay is a bay,  wide at its mouth and indenting , entered between Bertrand Ice Piedmont and Cape Berteaux along the west coast of Graham Land, Antarctica. First seen from a distance in 1909 by the French Antarctic Expedition under Jean-Baptiste Charcot, but not recognized as a large bay. First surveyed in 1936 by the BGLE under Rymill, and resurveyed by the Falkland Islands Dependencies Survey in 1948–49. The name was proposed by members of BGLE for Ejnar Mikkelsen, Danish Arctic explorer and Inspector for East Greenland, 1934–50.

External links

Bays of Graham Land
Fallières Coast